Shawn Weller (born July 8, 1986) is an American professional ice hockey forward who is currently playing for the Adirondack Thunder of the ECHL. He attended Clarkson University and graduated from South Glens Falls. Weller was drafted in the third round, 77th overall by the Ottawa Senators in the 2004 NHL Entry Draft

Playing career
Weller played prep hockey for South Glens Falls High School until his sophomore year when he decided to play junior hockey with the Capital District Selects of the Eastern Junior Hockey League. Weller was playing for Capital District Select during his draft eligible year. He was named an EJHL All-Star and EJHL MVP prior to the 2004 draft. Weller was drafted in the third round, 77th overall by the Ottawa Senators in the 2004 NHL Entry Draft. The pick had been received in a trade with the Los Angeles Kings for Radek Bonk.

After being drafted, Weller enrolled in Clarkson University as a Business major. He played three seasons for the Clarkson Golden Knights. His freshman season began late due to NCAA eligibility issues that forced Weller to sit out the first four games of the season. However, once he was able to play, he scored his first two collegiate goals in his debut against Niagara on October 29, 2004. During the first round of the 2004 ECAC Hockey Tournament, the Golden Knights beat the Union Dutchmen in three games with Weller scoring the winning goal in overtime to win game three and help the Golden Knights advance to the quarterfinals. The Golden Knights eventually lost to the Harvard Crimson in the Championship match.

In his sophomore year, Weller increased his offensive scoring and recorded 14 goals, a new career high. He stepped it up again in his junior season by leading the Golden Knights in scoring with 41 points, including a team-high 19 goals, and was named to the  ECAC All-Tournament Team. After Weller had finished the NCAA season with the Golden Knights, he was signed to an entry-level contract with the Senators on March 30, 2007. He made his professional debut with Ottawa's American Hockey League (AHL) affiliate, the Binghamton Senators for five games.

Weller was traded to the Anaheim Ducks on September 4, 2009, in exchange for Jason Bailey.

On July 26, 2010, Weller signed an AHL Contract, with the Manitoba Moose. He remained in the AHL the following season, splitting the year between the St. John's IceCaps and the Texas Stars.

On October 1, 2012, with limited AHL interest, Weller signed a one-year contract with ECHL club, the South Carolina Stingrays for the 2012–13 season. As captain of the Stingrays, Weller featured in 24 games for 15 points before he returned on loan to the St. John's IceCaps. On January 25, 2013, while with the IceCaps, Weller's ECHL rights were traded by the Stingrays to the Stockton Thunder. Weller finished the season with the Thunder, producing 11 points in 23 post-season games to help reach the Kelly Cup finals.

On August 3, 2013, Weller agreed to his first European contract on a one-year deal with German club, Starbulls Rosenheim of the DEL2. He played one season with club, scoring 70 points in 44 games. In May 2014, he signed with EV Ravensburg of the DEL2.

In the 2017–18 season, he captured the DEL2 championship with SC Bietigheim-Bissingen and was named Most Valuable Player of the playoffs.

Weller played seven seasons in the DEL2 before returning to North America and sitting out the pandemic shortened 2020–21 season. On August 6, 2021, Weller resumed his professional career in returning to the ECHL in signing with the Kansas City Mavericks. In the 2021–22 season, Weller made 19 appearances with the Mavericks before he was traded to the Adirondack Thunder in exchange for future considerations on January 13, 2022.

Career statistics

Regular season and playoffs

International

Awards and honors

References

External links

1986 births
Living people
Abbotsford Heat players
Adirondack Thunder players
American men's ice hockey left wingers
Bakersfield Condors (1998–2015) players
Binghamton Senators players
Clarkson Golden Knights men's ice hockey players
Dresdner Eislöwen players
Elmira Jackals (ECHL) players
ETC Crimmitschau players
Kansas City Mavericks players
Ottawa Senators draft picks
Manitoba Moose players
People from Saratoga County, New York
Ravensburg Towerstars players
St. John's IceCaps players
South Carolina Stingrays players
Starbulls Rosenheim players
Stockton Thunder players
Texas Stars players
SC Bietigheim-Bissingen players
American expatriate ice hockey players in Canada
American expatriate ice hockey players in Germany